Joachim Kunert (24 September 1929 – 18 September 2020) was a German film director and screenwriter. He directed more than 20 films between 1954 and 1989. His 1965 film The Adventures of Werner Holt was entered into the 4th Moscow International Film Festival.

Selected filmography
 Ein Strom fließt durch Deutschland (1954, documentary)
 Die Dresdner Philharmoniker (1955, documentary)
 Besondere Kennzeichen: keine (1956)
 Tatort Berlin (1958)
 Der Lotterieschwede (1958)
 Ehesache Lorenz (1959)
 Seilergasse 8 (1960)
 The Second Track (1962)
 The Adventures of Werner Holt (1965)

References

External links

1929 births
2020 deaths
Film people from Berlin